Rumoi Dam  is a rockfill dam located in Hokkaido Prefecture in Japan. The dam is used for flood control and water supply. The catchment area of the dam is 42 km2. The dam impounds about 220  ha of land when full and can store 23300 thousand cubic meters of water. The construction of the dam was started on 1984 and completed in 2009.

References

Dams in Hokkaido